Under Korean law, Koreans are prohibited from using drugs, even if they are in a country where the use of drugs is legal. South Koreans are forbidden to smoke marijuana, even if they are in countries where cannabis use is legalised or tolerated. When they return to South Korea, smoking a joint abroad can be punished with a prison sentence of up to five years. Cultivating, transporting or possessing cannabis is also illegal under South Korean criminal law, wherever you are. The Korean government regularly reminds its citizens of this prohibition. For example, the South Korean Embassy in Canada wrote (after cannabis use was legalized there in October 2019) that "it is illegal for South Koreans to use cannabis, even if they are in a region where cannabis is legal". The Korean police also recently announced in an appeal that South Koreans can be punished at home if they smoke cannabis in a country where it is legal.

Drug policy in South Korea 
In the South Korean context, a re-evaluation for listed drugs is a practical policy instrument that can make a major contribution to the rationalization of drug spending. In addition, the impact would be significant as it would affect the list and prices of new drugs, as the listed drugs could become the comparators for new drugs in the economic evaluation. Furthermore, in South Korea, "People don't know the effects of cannabis, because they have never experienced it." There is an enormous stigma surrounding drugs. This has to do with the cultural context of South Korea. The country is enormously influenced by the consequences of the opium war between Great Britain and China. Since then, there has been a huge taboo on all kinds of drugs in Korea.

Drug test policy 
Since December 2007, drug tests are mandatory for foreign teachers to be granted the extension of visas. In 2009, American teacher Andrea Vandom complaint about the policy and raised the issue at the Constitutional Court, which was dismissed. In 2013, Vandom petitioned the UN Human Rights Committee.  United Nations and Korea’s National Human Rights Commission pointed out the policy as discriminatory.

In 2021, a drug test policy for Korean teachers was introduced.

New Anti-rebate legislation 
In 2013, the government of South Korea had announced to reform in the drug anti-rebate law. In this way, pharmaceutical marketing could not rebate their practices. The main purpose of this law is to have the ability to bring criminal charges against doctors and pharmacists, who are receiving illegal drugs.

Previously, the provision of illegal income by pharmaceutical companies led only to judicial penalties, leaving doctors and pharmacists unpunished as recipients. Hereby, with the new law, it reforms criminal punishment for illegal rebates is extended to those receiving illegal kickbacks.

Gender differences 
According to the ESPAD report (Hibell et al. 2009) the male to female ratio is quite small for cannabis use and tie for any other illicit drug use worldwide. Nevertheless, significantly higher proportions of males than females report illicit drug use in developing countries such as South Africa. The study from (Perkonigg et al. 1998) found that in various countries, like South Korea, approximately twice as many adult men as women reported illicit drug use.

Drug abuse

Number of individuals suffering from Substance Use Disorder (SUD) over the past five years. 
Starting from 2013, the numbers of drug abuse has become increasingly high. Not only people who are using drugs, but also those with substance use disorder (SUD). In 2013 the article from KoreaBioMed, has shown that substance use disorder reached 15,000 a year and 77,000 people received treatment over the last five years. Hereby, the number of patients with substance use disorder has risen with the need for a new measure to control the problem.

However, there are still drug crimes in South Korea. The majority of drug-related crimes are mostly in Gangnam and Yongsan districts. Drugs are usually distributed through clubs, in Gangnam, foreign students and club operators tend to be involved in drug trafficking, which is an easy way to make money. The most common drug that is used and sold is 'Crystal Meth', this is accountable for most drug-related arrests. Moreover, other drugs known are ecstasy (xtc) and cannabis. These continue to grow in popularity among students. However, methamphetamine remains the drug of choice for Koreans.

Koreans abroad using drugs in a country where it is legal 
According to the Korean law it is strictly forbidden for Korean citizens who live abroad to use drugs, even though some drugs are legal in the country where they'd live. For example, the Netherlands has decriminalized cannabis and certain other ‘soft’ drugs, but others, such as MDMA and crystal meth remain strictly forbidden. However, South Korean law forbids Korean citizens living abroad from using drugs. With this law, Koreans are prohibited from smoking cannabis, even if they are in a country where cannabis use has been legalized or tolerated. Upon returning to South Korea, people who violate this law can be sentenced to up to five years in prison. The production, transport or possession of cannabis overseas is also illegal under South Korean law.

Despite many countries in the globe loosening their drug restrictions South Korea has remained very strict about their citizen’s drug use. These restrictions have incentivized Koreans to seek illegal methods to obtain drugs. Many citizens especially students studying abroad use this opportunity to explore drugs during their time in their new host country since access to them is a lot more accessible. People become so dependent on these drugs that when they return home they continue to seek them thus giving way for the illegal drug market to grow in South Korea. Even marijuana in form of e-cigrattes or edibles, which is legal in many parts of the world, is deemed punishable by the Korean government and if caught a person can be sentenced to prison and fines. However drug and substance use in South Korea has moved beyond recreation and has become a major problem of abuse. Even Lee Tae-kyung, a physician at the Department of Mental Hygiene in Seoul, described it as, “...drug abuse [that] should be considered a public health issue”, implying that substance abuse in Korea has become an epidemic that requires more than legal enforcement of drug use and misconduct. The problem impeding individuals from seeking medical or psychiatric help for substance abuse is that they are afraid to come forward about it. Current drug laws and policies restricting drug use and their punitive punishments instill fear in their citizens that even those suffering from drug abuse refuse to seek help for their addiction thus leaving thousands to suffer.

Prescription Drug Use 
As the population in South Korea continues to grow, the demand for higher quality healthcare services has increasingly followed as well. Surprisingly pharmaceutical expenditures have placed a large financial burden on civilians and healthcare insurers who are attempting to meet the exponentially rising costs of the pharmaceutical market. Between 2002 and 2013, the costs of pharmaceutical products rose from “10.2% annually to 28.3%”. These price increases were caused by the lack of separation between prescribing and dispensing of drugs in the health care system. Pharmacists had the power to both prescribe and dispense drugs to the public thus “creating financial incentives”  for them to sell products/drugs that were marked at “higher margins”  despite other medicine alternatives existing. Physicians soon realized the profit that they could make from pharmaceuticals and thus began overprescribing drugs to patients rather than offering medical services to increase their income. However it's important to note that this isn’t just an issue specific to South Korea but can be observed in even highly developed countries like America. America is currently battling against high pharmaceutical costs that primarily are effecting insulin costs. The cost for medicine in America is so extremely overpriced that “patients literally need to decide if they will pay for their insulin or for their housing and food.”. In efforts to alleviate South Koreans from these financial costs and contain the increasing prices of pharmaceuticals the government implemented the “Drug Expenditure Rationalization Plan”. In addition to lowering costs the policy also put strict restrictions on the drugs that their healthcare insurance would cover in efforts to limit overconsumption/prescription of drugs. However this policy left adverse affects on patients with chronic illness and low income status because they could not meet the new out of pocket costs that were placed on medications that didn’t qualify under the country’s covered drug list. A study conducted by Asia-Pacific Journal of Public Health concluded income level and prescription drug use were associated to one another. Based on the South Korea population, the more wealthier an individual is the more likely they are to consume prescription drugs despite the high number of ill cases in low-income groups.

Legal medical marijuana in South Korea 
Since 2020, South Korea is the first country in Asia to make medical applications of marijuana legal. Korea has always been against the use of drugs but however, with this step toward legalizing marijuana for medical use, it might be possible that marijuana will be totally legal at some point in Korea. To do this, CBD (hemp oil or cannabidiol) has to be legalized to proceed the legalization of marijuana. Furthermore, the use of hemp oil or cannabidiol is now legal for medical use. In addition, CBD has no side effects. Test results came forward, and it has shown that there are many benefits to the human body. The drug got tested for neurological and brain diseases. The laws in Korea will stay strict even though CBD is allowed.

See also 
 Cannabis in South Korea
 Drug liberalization
 Legality of cannabis
 Arguments for and against drug prohibition
 Drug policy
 War on drugs
 drug overdose

References